Koore may refer to:
 Koore people, an ethnic group of Ethiopia
 Koore language, their language

See also 
 Coore, a village in Ireland
 Koor (disambiguation)

Language and nationality disambiguation pages